Charles Delestraint (12 March 1879 – 19 April 1945) was a French Army lieutenant general and member of the French Resistance during World War II.  He also befriended Charles de Gaulle. Delestraint was killed by the Gestapo in 1945.

Early life
He was born in Biache Saint-Waast, Pas-de-Calais.

Military career

World War 1
Delestraint was captured early during World War I and spent the remainder of it as a prisoner of war.

Interwar Period
After the war he remained in the army where he was a proponent for the use of armoured forces.

World War 2
Delestraint retired in 1939 but was recalled to service after the outbreak of World War II. During the Battle of France, on 3 June 1940, he led the armoured counterattack against Germans in Abbeville.

In The Resistance
After the surrender of France on 25 June, he retired to Bourg-en-Bresse where Henri Frenay recruited him into the French Resistance. Delestraint began to organize resistance in Lyon. He clandestinely visited Charles de Gaulle in London and agreed to lead the Armée Secrète. He returned to France on 24 March 1943. However, due to informant René Hardy, he was arrested by the Gestapo on 9 June and interrogated by Klaus Barbie. He was taken as special prisoner (Nacht und Nebel) to Natzweiler-Struthof and then to the Dachau concentration camp, where he was executed on 19 April, only a few days before the camp was liberated and the war ended.

Honours 

 Commander of the Légion d'honneur
 Companion of the Liberation
 Croix de guerre 1914–1918 with palm
 Croix de guerre 1939–1945
 Croix de Guerre from Belgium

External links 

 Charles Delestraint 

1879 births
1945 deaths
People from Arras
French Resistance members
Companions of the Liberation
French military personnel of World War I
French people who died in Dachau concentration camp
Resistance members who died in Nazi concentration camps
Military personnel who died in Nazi concentration camps
Executed military leaders
French people executed by Nazi Germany
French people executed in Nazi concentration camps
Executed people from Nord-Pas-de-Calais
Resistance members killed by Nazi Germany